Peter III Aaron (died 1467), bastard son of Alexandru cel Bun, was a Voivode (Prince) of Moldavia on three occasions: October 1451 to February 1452, August 1454 to February 1455, and May 1455 to April 1457.  The first two were during a civil war with Alexăndrel.

Background 

Peter Aaron ascended to the throne after assassinating Bogdan II, while the latter was at a wedding in Rauseni. Immediately, his rule was challenged by Alexăndrel, whom Peter managed to defeat in March 1455, forcing Alexăndrel to take refuge in the fortress at Cetatea Albă.

Peter confirmed his father's commercial privileges awarded to Polish traders in Moldavia, and took an oath of vassalage to King Casimir IV. In 1456, Peter agreed to pay the Ottomans a tribute of 2,000 gold ducats, in order to ensure his southern borders, thus becoming the first of the Moldavian rulers to accept the Turkish demands.

The real challenge to his throne came with Bogdan II's son Ştefan cel Mare. The young prince had been given the protection of Kingdom of Hungary captain-general John Hunyadi and, after John's death, that of Vlad III Dracula (Vlad Ţepeş) - the new Prince of Wallachia. According to the interpretation of the account in the  Vlad had offered Ştefan his full support for his venture. In April 1457, after two battles, Peter was deposed and had to flee, taking refuge first in Poland and then in Székelyföld. There, he played a part in increasing the tensions between Ştefan cel Mare and King Matthias Corvinus. Following Matthias's incursion and subsequent defeat at the Battle of Baia (15 December 1467), Peter was captured and executed.

Peter Aaron issued new billon and copper currency - on the grosh design but struck in better silver, probably as a part of a reform in monetary standards.

See also

Notes

References
Brezianu, Andrei and Spânu, Vlad (eds.) (2007) "Petru Aron (?-1469)" Historical Dictionary of Moldova (2nd ed.) Scarecrow Press, Lanham, Maryland, USA, p. 284,

External links

Coins of Peter Aaron's mint

Rulers of Moldavia
1467 deaths
Year of birth unknown